Simeón Ola y Arboleda (September 2, 1865 – February 14, 1952) is a hero of the Philippine Revolution and was the last general of the Philippines to surrender to the American forces after the Philippine–American War.

Biography
Simeón Ola was born on September 2, 1865, to Vicente Ola and Apolonia Arboleda. He was enrolled in Mater Salutis College Seminary and studied Philosophy, but didn't finish the course. He joined the local branch of the Katipunan in his hometown province of Albay and later became the leader. With the help of a parish priest he was able to acquire arms to support his men. He was promoted to the rank of captain after the battle of Camalig in Albay, 1898 and again promoted to the rank of major after a daring ambush mission that led to the capture of three Americans. He was also the leader of the subsequent valiant attacks on Albay towns namely, Oas, Ligao and Jovellar. He later surrendered on the condition that his men would be granted amnesty. He was put on trial and was proven guilty of sedition and was sentenced to thirty years in prison. In 1904, he was given a pardon and returned to his place of birth and became the municipal president. The regional police command in Legazpi City was named after him.

Controversies 
There were at least 2 potential problems with regarding Ola as the last general to surrender to the American Forces. First, he had actually already surrendered earlier on July 5, 1901, as one of the officers (major) of Vito Belarmino. Second, there is no mention of his role as a zone commander in Miguel Malvar's statement on the condition of his command that he provided in December 1901.  nor were there any documentation of his commissioning as general by any recognized authority of the Philippine Republic.

Death
Simeon Ola died on February 14, 1952, and was interred at the Roman Catholic Cemetery of Guinobatan.

References

1865 births
1952 deaths
People of the Philippine Revolution
Filipino generals
People from Albay
Bicolano people
Katipunan members
Mayors of places in Albay
Recipients of American presidential pardons